Apolinary or Apollinary is a masculine given name. People who bear the name include:

 Apollinary Goravsky (1833–1900) was a Belarusian painter
 Apolinary Hartglas (1883–1953), Polish Jewish lawyer and Zionist activist
 Apolinary Kątski, birth name of Apollinaire de Kontski (1825–1879), Polish violinist, teacher and composer
 Apolinary Kotowicz (1859–1917), Polish painter
 Apolinary Szeluto (1884–1966), Polish pianist and composer
 Apollinary Vasnetsov (1856–1933), Russian painter
 Apolinary Wnukowski, Bishop of Płock from 1904 to 1908 - see List of bishops of Płock

See also
 Apollinaris (disambiguation)

Masculine given names